Force of Nature is a blues album by Koko Taylor, released in 1993 by Alligator Records. Taylor duetted with Buddy Guy on the cover of "Born Under a Bad Sign". "Mother Nature" was written by Little Milton.

Critical reception

The Guardian noted that "her lung-bursting style is remarkably intact, and showed off to perfection on earth-shaking 'Hound Dog'."

Track listing
  "Mother Nature" (Milton Campbell) – 4:41
  "If I Can't Be First" (Ike Turner) – 3:40
  "Hound Dog" (Jerry Leiber, Mike Stoller) – 5:33
  "Born Under a Bad Sign" with Buddy Guy (William Bell, Booker T. Jones) – 6:22
  "Let the Juke Joint Jump" (Vasti Jackson) – 6:08
  "63 Year Old Mama" (Koko Taylor) – 4:29
  "Don't Put Your Hands On Me" (Rick Estrin) – 2:53
  "Bad Case of Loving You (Doctor, Doctor)" (Moon Martin) – 4:23
  "Fish in Dirty Water" (Fleecie Moore, Spencer) – 5:45
  "Tit for Tat" (Bucky Lindsey, Larry Shell) – 4:31 
  "Put the Pot On" (Koko Taylor) – 3:48
  "Nothing Takes the Place of You" (Toussaint McCall, Alan Robinson) – 4:41
  "Spellbound" (Koko Taylor) – 4:07
  "Greedy Man" (Morris Dollison) – 3:27

References

Koko Taylor albums
1993 albums
Albums produced by Bruce Iglauer
Alligator Records albums